The  is a botanical garden located within the Fuji-Hakone-Izu National Park at 817 Sengokuhara, Hakone, Kanagawa, Japan. It is open daily in the warmer months; an admission fee is charged.

The garden was founded in 1976, and now contains some 1700 plant varieties, including about 200 types of woody and herbaceous wetland plants from Japan, as well as 1300 varieties (120 species) of alpine plants. Collections include Habenaria, Hemerocallis, Iris, Lilium, Lysichitum, and Primula, plus deciduous trees such as Acer, Cornus, and Quercus.

External links 
 Hakone National Park
 BGCI entry

See also 
 List of botanical gardens in Japan
 Fuji-Hakone-Izu National Park

References

Botanical gardens in Japan
Gardens in Kanagawa Prefecture
Fuji-Hakone-Izu National Park
Hakone, Kanagawa
Wetlands of Japan